Barend Jackobus Potgieter (born 28 December 1994) is a South African rugby union player for the  in the Currie Cup and the Rugby Challenge. His regular position is a loosehead prop, but he can also play as a flanker.

Rugby career

2013–2016: Youth rugby / Sharks XV

He moved to Durban prior to the 2013 season to join the  Academy. He started all thirteen matches for the  team in the 2013 Under-19 Provincial Championship as a flanker.

Potgieter progressed to the Sharks' Under-21 side for the 2014 Under-21 Provincial Championship. After starting two of their matches as a flanker, he moved to loosehead prop for the remainder of the competition, making a further seven starts. He scored tries in matches against  (away),  and Border (home) as the Sharks finished in fifth position, failing to qualify for the semi-finals.

He made two more starts – against  and the  – during the regular season as the Sharks XV missed out on the quarter finals after finishing sixth in the Southern Section.

Potgieter made six starts and six appearances off the bench for the  team in the 2015 Under-21 Provincial Championship as he and Mzamo Majola alternated the spot in the starting lineup throughout the competition.

2016: Eastern Province Kings

In August 2016, Potgieter was among a number of players included in a hastily assembled  squad; the team was liquidated the day before the 2016 Currie Cup Premier Division started, but quickly reformed and contracted a number of players that didn't feature in other teams' plans for the season. He made his debut in the Currie Cup Premier Division in his hometown, coming on as a replacement in the 52nd minute of the match. With their limited preparation time, it proved to be a difficult season for the Eastern Province Kings and they finished bottom of the log, losing all eight of their matches.

References

South African rugby union players
Living people
1994 births
Rugby union players from Pretoria
Rugby union props
Eastern Province Elephants players